The 2018 Under-21 Provincial Championship was the 2018 edition of the Under-21 Provincial Championship, an annual national Under-21 rugby union competition held in South Africa, and was contested from 25 August to 27 October 2018.

Competition rules and information

There was seven participating teams in the 2018 Under-21 Provincial Championship. They played each other once during the pool stage, either at home or away. Teams receive four points for a win and two points for a draw. Bonus points were awarded to teams that scored four or more tries in a game, as well as to teams that lost a match by seven points or less. Teams were ranked by log points, then points difference (points scored less points conceded).

The top four teams in the pool stage qualified for the semifinals, which were followed by a final.

Teams

The teams that played in the 2018 Under-21 Provincial Championship are:

Pool stage

Standings

Matches

Round one

Round two

Round three

Round four

Round five

Round six

Round seven

Title play-offs

Semifinals

Final

Honours

The honour roll for the 2018 Under-21 Provincial Championship was as follows:

Players

The following squads were named for the 2018 Under-21 Provincial Championship:

Referees

The following referees officiated matches in the 2018 Under-21 Provincial Championship:

See also

 2018 Currie Cup Premier Division
 2018 Currie Cup First Division

References

External links
 SARU website

2018 in South African rugby union
2018 rugby union tournaments for clubs
2018